Ildefonso Guajardo Villarreal   (born 19 April 1957) is a Mexican economist and politician from the Institutional Revolutionary Party. He previously served as the Secretary of Economy of Mexico during the presidency of Enrique Peña Nieto.

He also served as Deputy of the LVIII and LIX Legislatures of the Mexican Congress representing Nuevo León.

For more than three decades, served in a wide range of leading positions in international organizations and the public sector, both in the legislative and executive branches of Mexico, in charge of international trade, trade negotiations, economic competition, industrial policy, and regulatory improvement, among others.

He served as Mexico’s Secretary of Economy. During his tenure, he led many trade negotiations, such as the modernization of the United States-Mexico-Canada Agreement (USMCA, formerly NAFTA) the Free Trade Agreement between Mexico and the European Union, and the negotiations of the Comprehensive and Progressive Agreement for Trans-Pacific Partnership (CPTPP) and the Pacific Alliance.

References

1957 births
Living people
Politicians from Monterrey
Mexican economists
Members of the Chamber of Deputies (Mexico) for Nuevo León
Institutional Revolutionary Party politicians
Mexican Secretaries of Economy
Autonomous University of Nuevo León alumni
Honorary Knights Commander of the Order of the British Empire
21st-century Mexican politicians
Deputies of the LVII Legislature of Mexico
Deputies of the LIX Legislature of Mexico